STV may refer to:

Television
 Satellite television
 Direct-broadcast satellite television (DBSTV)

Channels and stations
 STV (TV channel), the brand name of ITV Network broadcasters in central and northern Scotland
 Scottish Television, now legally known as STV Central Ltd and part of the STV network
 Grampian Television, now legally known as STV North Ltd and part of the STV network
Shanghai Television, a TV station in Shanghai, China
 STV (TV station), a TV station in Mildura, Victoria, Australia
 STV AS, Estonian television and Internet company
 Samanyolu TV, based in Istanbul, Turkey
 Sapporo Television Broadcasting, a TV station in Hokkaidō, Japan and its associated radio station
 Saskatchewan Television, the former on-air brand of CFRE-DT Regina and Saskatoon
 Slovenská televízia, a Slovak public television network
 Social TV (Philippines), a TV channel operated by UNTV (Philippines)
 Sunda TV (now Kompas TV Jawa Barat), an Indonesian television station based in Bandung
 Multi-Choice TV, formerly known as Subscription Television (STV)
 University of North Carolina at Chapel Hill Student Television

Entertainment
 Straight to video, a movie which was never released in theatres
 Sega Titan Video (ST-V), an arcade system board used by Sega in the mid-1990s

Transport
 Single-track vehicle, a vehicle that leaves a single ground track as it moves forward
 STV, the MRT station abbreviation for Stevens MRT station, Singapore
 Surat Airport, India, by IATA code

Politics
 Single transferable vote, a system where a voter specifies their order of preference of the candidates, and those preferences are used to transfer votes that were originally given to candidates who are eliminated during the count
 Straight-ticket voting, the practice of voting for every candidate that a political party has on a general election ballot, or a mechanism which enables voters to vote for that party's candidates in multiple simultaneous elections

Other uses
 STV Group, a media holding company based in Glasgow, Scotland
 STV Inc., an American civil engineering firm
 STV Horst-Emscher, a defunct German association football club
 St V, holiday celebrating the founding of the Free University in Brussels, Belgium
 Subjective theory of value, an economic theory
 Ship prefix for sail training vessel

See also
 ST5 (disambiguation)